Finnvær Lighthouse is a coastal lighthouse in the municipality of Frøya in Trøndelag county, Norway. The lighthouse is located at Finnværet on the small island of Valøya in the Froan islands. The lighthouse was originally built in 1912 but in 1985 it was closed and a new automated tower was built right next to it.

Current tower
The roof is painted red. The isophase light is on for four seconds and then off for four seconds emitting a white, red or green light (depending on direction). The tower is powered by solar power.

Old tower
The original lighthouse was built in 1912. It was attached to a -story lighthouse keeper's house. The old tower was closed in 1985 when the new automated tower was completed.

See also

 List of lighthouses in Norway
 Lighthouses in Norway

References

External links
 Norsk Fyrhistorisk Forening 

Lighthouses completed in 1912
Lighthouses completed in 1985
Froan
Lighthouses in Trøndelag
1912 establishments in Norway